The 1924 Boston College Eagles football team represented Boston College an independent during the 1924 college football season. Led sixth-year head coach Frank Cavanaugh, Boston College compiled a record of 6–3.

Schedule

References

Boston College
Boston College Eagles football seasons
Boston College Eagles football
1920s in Boston